Stericta divitalis is a moth of the family Pyralidae first described by Achille Guenée in 1854. It is found in India and Sri Lanka.

References

External links
Revision and phylogenetic analysis of Accinctapubes solis

Pyralinae
Moths of Asia
Moths described in 1854